The Wen'an–Machangping railway (Simplified Chinese: 瓮马铁路) is a single-track electrified freight railway in China.

Route
The line leaves the Shanghai–Kunming railway east of Fuquan railway station, which is located in Machangping village and heads north. It is expected to open in April.

Extensions
Further extensions are planned that will see the line extended south from Fuquan to Duyun on the Guizhou–Guangxi railway, and northwest from Wen'an to meet the Sichuan–Guizhou railway. The full length of the railway including the extensions will be .

References

Railway lines in China